Prodeus is an indie first-person shooter video game developed by Bounding Box Software and published by Humble Games. The game was crowdfunded by a successful Kickstarter campaign in April 2019. An early access version was released on November 9, 2020. The full game was released on macOS, Microsoft Windows, Nintendo Switch, PlayStation 4, PlayStation 5, Xbox One, and Xbox Series X/S in September 2022.

Gameplay 
The developers describe Prodeus as "the first-person shooter of old, re-imagined using modern rendering techniques." The gameplay resembles that of classic 1990s first-person shooters such as Doom and Quake. The player must explore complex levels, sometimes searching out keys to progress, while engaging enemies in fast-paced combat using a variety of weapons. To help the player find their way, and to aid in discovering secrets, the game features an automap similar in function to those featured in games such as Doom, Duke Nukem 3D, and Metroid Prime.

Prodeus employs a modern game engine to extend the experience of classic shooters with visuals such as dynamic lighting and particle effects, interactive levels, a gore system, and a dynamic soundtrack. Though the game may be played entirely with modern visuals, the game allows the player to apply shaders that give the game a pixelated look, simulating resolutions down to 360p or even 216p. The game also has the option to dynamically convert enemy and item models to sprites, further simulating a retro experience.

Plot 
The player assumes control of a corrupted agent of Prodeus, the mysterious creator of the player and the game world. The only goal is to destroy Prodeus and anything that gets in the way.

Development 
Developers Mike Voeller and Jason Mojica met while working together at Raven Software on Singularity. By 2017, Voeller had decided to leave the industry to pursue an idea for a retro first-person shooter (that would become Prodeus). Around that time, Mojica reconnected with Voeller and decided to leave his job at Starbreeze Studios to join the project. Later, the two recruited Andrew Hulshult for the soundtrack and Josh "Dragonfly" O'Sullivan from the Doom modding community to work on level design.

Prodeus was announced in November 2018. The launch trailer and later gameplay demos were created with a pre-alpha version of the game showcasing a typical level.

The developers have stated that community engagement was considered a core principle of the game from the beginning. Thus, Prodeus includes an integrated level editor from day one. Anyone who owns the game on a PC will have the same tools used by the developers to make levels from scratch. The level editor is built specifically for Prodeus and is designed for speed and ease of use.

Despite originally promising a native Linux version, it was announced on September 5, 2022 that the game would instead merely be tailored for the Proton compatibility layer, citing issues with platform support from the Unity game engine.

Reception 

The game received "generally favorable reviews", according to the aggregator Metacritic.

References

External links 
 

First-person shooters
Early access video games
2022 video games
Windows games
Cancelled Linux games
MacOS games
Nintendo Switch games
PlayStation 4 games
Xbox One games
Video games developed in the United States
Video games scored by Andrew Hulshult
Kickstarter-funded video games
Indie video games
Multiplayer and single-player video games
Sprite-based first-person shooters